Insensole is an organic compound that is naturally found as its acetate ester in some frankincense. It is a diterpene alcohol, with an oily appearance. This compound can be synthetically prepared from cembrene.

The formula of insensole is C20H34O2

Incensole acetate is the O-acetyl derivative. It acts as a TRPV3 agonist. Its effects on animals have been studied.

References 

Diterpenes
Secondary alcohols
Heterocyclic compounds with 2 rings
Oxygen heterocycles
Isopropyl compounds